Nerita textilis, common name the textile nerite, is a species of sea snail, a marine gastropod mollusk in the family Neritidae.

Description
The shell grows to a length of 5 cm. Its surface texture shows broad, ridged, spiral cords. The thick operculum is granulose. The exterior is white with black spots that are widely spaced on the cords. The outer lip is thick and denticulate. Its colour is  bluish-grey.

Distribution
This species occurs on rocks in the littoral fringe of the Red Sea and in the Indo-Pacific off Aldabra, the east coast of South Africa, Kenya, Madagascar, the Mascarene basin, Mozambique and Tanzania.

References

 Drivas, J. & M. Jay (1988). Coquillages de La Réunion et de l'île Maurice
 Kilburn, R.N. & Rippey, E. (1982) Sea Shells of Southern Africa. Macmillan South Africa, Johannesburg, xi + 249 pp. page(s): 49
 Richmond, M. (Ed.) (1997). A guide to the seashores of Eastern Africa and the Western Indian Ocean islands. Sida/Department for Research Cooperation, SAREC: Stockholm, Sweden. . 448 pp
  Branch, G.M. et al. (2002). Two Oceans. 5th impression. David Philip, Cate Town & Johannesburg.

Neritidae
Gastropods described in 1791